PDX Football Club is an American soccer club from Portland, Oregon, United States. The club was established in 2017 and currently plays in USL League Two. The club previously played in the National Premier Soccer League's West Region, Northwest Conference.

History

PDX FC was founded by Luke Babson, an assistant coach at Western Oregon University, and Max Babson, a media producer for BeIN Sports and the Pac-12 Network. The club was announced as a NPSL expansion team on February 13, 2017, joining the Northwest Conference for the 2017 season. During their inaugural season, the club missed a playoff position by only two points, finishing third in the table.

In 2021, PDX joined USL League Two.

PDX currently has two championships under their belt, having won the Oregon Open Cup in 2020 and the NISA Independent Cup Pacific Region in 2021. The club also finished 2nd place during the 2021 USL League Two Season

Club culture

Supporters 
The Black Hearts Union officially formed in 2019 to support the then-NPSL side PDX FC; but it was in 2021 when the club began playing in USL2 that the group started gaining traction. That same year PDX FC went supporter-owned, & the vast majority of the SG's members are stakeholders in the club. They are among the most passionate supporters in USL2's Northwest Division, often attracting the most away support in the conference and enter opposing side's home fields with a punk rock attitude that screams with snot-nosed indifference, "we're going to be louder, more obnoxious, and more fun than you." Black Hearts Union joined the Independent Supporters' Council in 2022.

Year-by-year

References

2017 establishments in Oregon
Association football clubs established in 2017
National Premier Soccer League teams
Soccer clubs in Oregon
Sports teams in Portland, Oregon